Michael Gaughan (5 October 1949 – 3 June 1974) was a Provisional Irish Republican Army (IRA) hunger striker who died in 1974 in Parkhurst Prison on the Isle of Wight, England.

Background 
Gaughan, the eldest of six children, was born in Ballina, County Mayo, in 1949.  Gaughan grew up at Healy Terrace and was educated at St Muredach's College, Ballina, and after finishing his schooling, he emigrated from Ireland to England in search of work.

Whilst in London, Gaughan became a member of the Official Irish Republican Army (OIRA) through Official Sinn Féin's English wing Clann na hÉireann and became an IRA volunteer in a London-based Active Service Unit. In December 1971, he was sentenced at the Old Bailey to seven years imprisonment for his part in an IRA fundraising mission to rob a bank in Hornsey, north London, which yielded just £530, and for the possession of two revolvers.

Gaughan was initially imprisoned at Wormwood Scrubs, where he spent two years before being transferred to the top security Albany Prison on the Isle of Wight. Whilst at Albany Prison, Gaughan requested political status; this was refused, and he was then put in solitary confinement. He was later transferred to Parkhurst Prison, where four of the Belfast Ten were on hunger strike for political status.

On 31 March 1974, Gaughan, along with current Sinn Féin MLA Gerry Kelly, Paul Holme, Hugh Feeney and fellow Mayoman Frank Stagg, went on hunger strike to support the fight of Dolours and Marian Price to obtain political status and to be transferred to a jail in Ireland. The prisoners' demands were as follows.

 The right to political status
 The right to wear their own clothes
 A guarantee that they would not be returned to solitary confinement
 The right to educational facilities and not engage in penal labour
 The setting of a reasonable date for a transfer to an Irish prison
On 10 April 1974 Gaughan and Stagg were both transferred to the prison hospital for observation; force-feeding began two weeks later.

Force-feeding 
British policy at this time was to force feed hunger strikers. According to the National Hunger Strike Commemoration Committee, "six to eight guards would restrain the prisoner and drag him or her by the hair to the top of the bed, where they would stretch the prisoner's neck over the metal rail, force a block between his or her teeth and then pass a feeding tube, which extended down the throat, through a hole in the block."

After visiting Michael in jail, his brother John described his condition: "His throat had been badly cut by force feeding and his teeth loosened. His eyes were sunken, his cheeks hollow and his mouth was gaping open. He weighed about six stone."

During his hunger strike, his weight dropped from 160 lb to 84 lb Gaughan was force-fed from 22 April and this occurred 17 times during course of his hunger strike. The last time he was force-fed was the night before his death on Sunday 2 June. After a hunger strike that lasted 64 days, he died on Monday 3 June 1974, aged 24 years old. Gaughan was one of 22 Irish republicans to die on hunger strike in the 20th century, the largest hunger strike was the 1923 Irish Hunger Strikes.

The cause of his death was disputed. The British government stated that he died of pneumonia; the Gaughan family stated that he died after prison doctors injured him fatally when food lodged in a lung punctured by a force-feeding tube.

Gaughan's death caused controversy in English medical circles, as some forms of treatment can be classed as assault if given without the express permission of the patient.

The timing of his death came just one week after the British Government had capitulated to the demands of the loyalist Ulster Workers' Council strike. After Gaughan's death, the British government's policy of force-feeding ended, and the remaining hunger strikers were given assurances that they would be repatriated to Irish prisons. However, these promises were reneged on by the British government.

Final message 
Michael Gaughan left a final message:

His death is referenced in the song Take me Home to Mayo, also known as The Ballad of Michael Gaughan, composed by Seamus Robinson and performed and recorded by many Irish musicians including Christy Moore, the Wolfe Tones and Derek Warfield and the Dublin City Ramblers.

Funeral

Gaughan's body was initially removed from London and on Friday, 7 June, and on Saturday, 8 June 1974, over 3,000 mourners lined the streets of Kilburn and marched behind his coffin, which was flanked by an IRA honour guard, to a Requiem Mass held in the Church of the Sacred Heart of Jesus.

On Saturday, his body was transported to Dublin, where again it was met by mourners and another IRA guard of honour who brought it to the Adam and Eve's Franciscan church on Merchant's Quay, where thousands filed past as it lay in state. The following day, his body was removed to Ballina, County Mayo. The funeral mass took place on 9 June, at St. Muredach's Cathedral, and the procession then led to Leigue Cemetery. Gaughan was given a full IRA funeral and was laid to rest in the republican plot, where Frank Stagg would join him after being reburied in November 1976. His funeral was attended by over 50,000 people and was larger than the funeral of former president Éamon de Valera the following year.

Ballina republican Jackie Clarke presided at the last obsequies, and the oration at his graveside was given by Dáithí Ó Conaill, who stated that Gaughan had "been tortured in prison by the vampires of a discredited empire who were joined by decrepit politicians who were a disgrace to the name of Irishmen".

His coffin was draped in the same Tricolour that was used for Terence McSwiney's funeral 54 years earlier. It would later be used for the funeral of James McDade, an IRA member killed in a premature explosion in Coventry.

The funeral embarrassed the anti-republican Fine Gael/Labour coalition government in Dublin at the time and its Taoiseach, Liam Cosgrave. Paddy Cooney, Minister for Justice at the time, claimed that the IRA intimidated businesses in the towns that the funeral procession passed through, forcing them to close.

Commemoration
There are annual lectures and commemorations in honour of Gaughan, Frank Stagg and Sean McNeela (a Ballycroy IRA man who died on hunger strike in Dublin in 1940) at the republican plot in Ballina by both Republican Sinn Féin and Sinn Féin, which includes a march from the Humbert monument in Ballina to Leigue Cemetery. The Republican Sinn Féin cumann in Mayo is named the McNeela-Gaughan-Stagg Cumann.

On 12 February 2006, a mural, dedicated to Stagg and Gaughan, was unveiled on the Falls Road in Belfast. In August 2020 a mural was erected on his behalf in the lane behind his home house of Healy Terrace.

External links
 Take Me Home To Mayo, the ballad of Michael Gaughan

References

1949 births
1974 deaths
Irish bank robbers
Irish people imprisoned abroad
Irish people who died in prison custody
Irish prisoners who died on hunger strike
Irish republicans
Official Irish Republican Army members
People from Ballina, County Mayo
Prisoners who died in England and Wales detention
Provisional Irish Republican Army members
Republicans imprisoned during the Northern Ireland conflict